Scarabeefilms B.V. is a Dutch corporation specialized in the production of creative documentaries, short films and feature films about all kind of arts, cultural and social subjects for the cinema and public broadcasting.

Establishment
Scarabeefilms was founded by Hetty Naaijkens-Retel Helmrich in 1989. The main office is located in Rotterdam, Netherlands. Scarabee has a second office in Orlando, Florida, United States.

Products
 Moving Objects directed by Leonard Retel Helmrich, 1991
 Broken Silence directed by Eline Flipse, 1995
 La Chaconne d'Auschwitz directed by Michel Daeron, 1998
 Chin-Ind directed by Yan Ting Yuen, 1999
 Yang Ban Xi - The Model Works directed by Yan Ting Yuen, 2005
 Tour des Legendes directed by Erik van Empel, 2003
 Eye of the Day directed by Leonard Retel Helmrich, 2001
 Shape of the Moon directed by Leonard Retel Helmrich, 2004
 Position among the Stars directed by Leonard Retel Helmrich, 2005

International cooperators
 Les Films d'Ici
 TNS
 Artcam
 Regards Productions
 J.P. Weiner Productions
 ADR Productions, Paris, France
 Egoli films, Berlin, Germany
 Icelandic Film Corporation
 Cine 3, Belgium

External links
 http://www.scarabeefilms.com

Film production companies of the Netherlands
Companies based in Rotterdam